Saphrys is a genus of spiders in the family Salticidae. It was first described in 2015 by Zhang & Maddison. , it contains 9 species.

Species
As of July 2017, the World Spider Catalog accepts the following species in the genus Saphrys:
 Saphrys a-notata (Mello-Leitão, 1940) –  Argentina, Chile
 Saphrys flordellago (Richardson, 2010) –  Brazil, Chile 
 Saphrys laetata (Simon, 1904) –   Chile 
 Saphrys mapuche (Galiano, 1968) –  Chile 
 Saphrys patagonica (Simon, 1905) –   Chile, Argentina
 Saphrys rapida (C. L. Koch, 1846) –  Chile
 Saphrys rusticana (Nicolet, 1849) –  Chile
 Saphrys saitiformis (Simon, 1901) –   Chile, Argentina 
 Saphrys tehuelche (Galiano, 1968) –  Chile

References

Salticidae
Salticidae genera
Spiders of South America